Don't You Fake It is the debut studio album by American rock band the Red Jumpsuit Apparatus. The title is taken from a line in the opening track, "In Fate's Hands". The album garnered mixed reviews from critics. Don't You Fake It debuted at number 25 on the Billboard 200 and spawned three singles: "Face Down", "False Pretense" and "Your Guardian Angel". To promote the record, the band toured across North America with appearances at music festivals.

Recording
In January 2006, AbsolutePunk reported that the band was in the process of recording their debut album.

Release
On March 4, 2006, "Face Down" was posted on the Red Jumpsuit Apparatus' Myspace profile. A music video was released for the song three days later. In May 2006, they appeared at The Bamboozle festival. Don't You Fake It was made available for streaming via AOL on July 17, 2006, before being released a day later. They went on a headlining US tour in August and September 2006, where they were supported by Monty Are I, and then appeared at the Bamboozle Left festival. On January 26, 2007, the music video for "False Pretense" was posted online. In February and March 2007, the band headlined that year's Take Action Tour. "False Pretense" impacted radio on March 13, 2007. The album was re-released on March 20. Following this, they appeared at The Bamboozle festival. From late June to late August, the band went on the 2007 edition of Warped Tour. "Your Guardian Angel" was released to radio on August 7. In October and November, the band went on a US tour with Amber Pacific and New Years Day. In April 2008, the band went on an acoustic US tour, dubbed Unplugged and Unaffected. In early May, the band appeared at the 2008 edition of the Bamboozle festival.

Remaster
In 2014, the band released "Don't You Fake It (Alliance Edition)", a remaster of the album.  The remaster, as told by the band, was specifically done for an iTunes release, but is also available on other platforms.  The tracklisting is mostly identical to the original album, but removes "Damn Regret", and adds "Disconnected" from the Deluxe Edition as well as "The Grimm Goodbye" from certain releases of the original album.

Reception

Critical response

A writer for Alternative Addiction called the band's overall musicianship "a mouth-watering hybrid of the best traits associated with bands like Underoath, Story of the Year and The All American Rejects", concluding that "TRJA may lack innovation, but push all the right buttons in terms of merging popular rock genres." Corey Apar from AllMusic praised the single "Face Down" as a highlight and commended both "Cat and Mouse" and "Your Guardian Angel" for breaking up the "steadfast urgency" throughout the album, but felt the overall sound was too reminiscent of contemporaries like Jimmy Eat World and The Used, concluding that "it's all not quite enough to wash out the generic taste left in one's mouth by the end. The band may not be faking anything, but even earnestness isn't always enough." IGNs Chad Grischow said that there was "more promise than substance on their debut", giving praise to Ronnie Winter's vocal performance and the tracks for containing "a powerful rock punch with hard-crashing guitar riffs and driving beats supporting solid emo hooks", but said that it "fits a little too comfortably among the hundreds of other pop-punk and emo releases of the summer. It is certainly not the worst of them, but it is hardly the best either." He concluded that "in the overcrowded state of the genre their debut fails to make a splash."

Commercial performance
The album debuted at number 25 on the Billboard 200 and moved 25,000 copies in its first week. By August 2006, the album had sold over 100,000 copies, and has sold 852,000 copies as of August 2008. It was eventually certified Platinum in May 2016.

Track listing

Tracks 1, 4, 6, 10, 11, 12 and 14 originally appear on The Red Jumpsuit Apparatus.
Tracks 1 and 11 have alternate names.
In Fates Hands alternate name is Ass Shaker.
Your Guardian Angel alternate name is The Acoustic Song.

DVD
Making the Album – Behind the Scenes
"Face Down" (music video)
"False Pretense" (music video)
Behind the Scenes – "False Pretense"
On the Road with RJA

Personnel
Credits adapted from the liner notes of Don't You Fake It.

The Red Jumpsuit Apparatus
 Ronnie Winter – lead vocals, acoustic guitar, piano
 Elias Reidy – lead guitar, backing vocals 
 Duke Kitchens – rhythm guitar
 Joey Westwood – bass guitar
 Jon Wilkes – drums, percussion

Additional musicians
Randy Winter – drums, sequencers on "In Fate's Hands" and "Justify"
Dan Korneff – strings

Production
David Bendeth – producer, mixing
Isaiah Abolin – assistant engineer
Anthony Fontana – assistant engineer
Ted Young – assistant engineer
John Bender – digital editing, engineer 
Kato Khandwala – digital editing, engineer
Dan Korneff – digital editing, mixing on "The Grim Goodbye"
Ted Jensen – mastering at Sterling Sound, NYC

Artwork
Sean Mosher-Smith – creative direction
Dzark Design Bureau – design
Myriam Santos-Kayda – photography

Charts and certifications

Weekly charts

Year-end charts

Singles

Certifications

References

2006 debut albums
The Red Jumpsuit Apparatus albums
Pop punk albums by American artists
Albums produced by David Bendeth